Tomáš Rolinek (born February 17, 1980 in Žďár nad Sázavou, Czechoslovakia) is a Czech former ice hockey player. He was a forward, and has played for the national team. He won the Extraliga in 2005 with HC Pardubice.

International career
Rolinek played in the 2006, 2007, 2008, 2009, 2010, and 2011 World Championships for the Czech Republic. He captained the team that won the 2010 IIHF World Championship and the team that finished third at the 2011 World Championship. He also played for the national team at the 2010 Winter Olympics.

Career statistics

Regular season and playoffs

International

References

External links

 Tomáš Rolinek at the official page of HC Pardubice
 

1980 births
Living people
Czech ice hockey forwards
Czech expatriate ice hockey players in Russia
HC Bílí Tygři Liberec players
HC Litvínov players
HC Dynamo Pardubice players
Ice hockey players at the 2010 Winter Olympics
Metallurg Magnitogorsk players
Olympic ice hockey players of the Czech Republic
People from Žďár nad Sázavou
Sportspeople from the Vysočina Region